Harrison Paul Davis III (born February 20, 1952) is a former American football wide receiver in the National Football League (NFL) who played for the San Diego Chargers. He played college football for the Virginia Cavaliers.

He played quarterback at Virginia.

References

1952 births
Living people
American football wide receivers
American football quarterbacks
San Diego Chargers players
Virginia Cavaliers football players